Ex on the Beach Couples: Now or Never is the sixth season of the American version of the reality television show Ex on the Beach. It premiered on MTV on February 9, 2023. In April 2022, MTV released a casting call for a new season, and also announced a new format for the show, featuring real life couples for the first time.

Cast

Episodes

References

External links 

 Official website

2023 American television seasons
2020 American television seasons
Ex on the Beach